Skybridge is a high-rise luxury condominium located in the West Loop of Chicago. It won the 2003 bronze Emporis Skyscraper Award. The base of the building is home to a Whole Foods grocery store. The building climbs to 38 stories, while the top two are home to the penthouses.  The 36th floor contains a workout facility for tenants and a roof-top garden space. The building was designed by Perkins and Will.

See also 
List of tallest buildings in Chicago

References 

Residential skyscrapers in Chicago
Residential condominiums in Chicago
Residential buildings completed in 2003
2003 establishments in Illinois